Lady into Fox was David Garnett's first novel using his own name, published in 1922. This short and enigmatic work won the James Tait Black Memorial Prize, and the Hawthornden Prize a year later. Being a work of fantasy set in the present-day society, it fits into the category of Contemporary Fantasy which was not yet recognized as a distinct genre at the time of writing.

Plot summary

Silvia Tebrick, the 24-year-old wife of Richard Tebrick, suddenly becomes a fox while they are out walking in the woods. Mr. Tebrick sends away all the servants in an attempt to keep Silvia's new nature a secret, although Silvia's childhood nurse returns. While Silvia initially acts human, insisting on wearing clothing and playing piquet, her behaviour increasingly becomes that characteristic of a vixen, causing the husband a great deal of anguish.  Eventually, Mr. Tebrick releases Silvia into the wild, where she gives birth to five kits, whom Tebrick names and plays with every day. Despite Tebrick's efforts to protect Silvia and her cubs, she is ultimately killed by dogs during a fox hunt; Tebrick, who tried to save Silvia from the dogs, is badly wounded, but eventually recovers.

McSweeney's Collins Library imprint republished Lady into Fox in 2004.

Reception and influence
Rebecca West described Lady Into Fox as one of the  "best imaginative productions" of the decade.

The success of the novel resulted in several imitations. They included a parody by Christopher Ward (1868-1943) Gentleman Into Goose (1924), while Vercors' homage Sylva (1961), depicts a fox transforming into a woman.

Adaptation
In 1939, British choreographer Andrée Howard created a musical work of the same name based on Garnett's book for Ballet Rambert. Sally Gilmour dancing Silvia Tebrick assured the ballet's success. The music was an arrangement of piano pieces by Arthur Honegger (Sept pièces brèves and Toccata et variations), setting and costumes designed by Nadia Benois.

References

External links 
 
 
 

1922 British novels
British fantasy novels
Chatto & Windus books
Hawthornden Prize-winning works
Novels by David Garnett
Books about foxes
Fiction about shapeshifting